Vertis North is a mixed-used development in Quezon City, Metro Manila, Philippines.

History
Vertis North is a joint project by private firm Ayala Land, Inc. (ALI) and state-agency National Housing Authority (Philippines) (NHA). The NHA is responsible for relocating settlers living in the area. The Vertis North project was launched in 2012.

In October 2015, Bloomberry Resorts Corp. purchased a 15.7-hectare property from the National Housing Authority (NHA) for P1.98 billion. It will be developed into a casino called Solaire Resort North and will feature a hotel tower with up to 550 rooms and a gaming area with up to 200 gaming tables and as many as 3,000 slot machines. 

The first phase of the project which includes the Ayala Malls Vertis North shopping mall, the Seda Vertis North hotel, and residential projects was launched in 2017.

Features

More than half of Vertis North's area is allocated for office use.

The Ayala Malls Vertis North shopping mall is within the area's premise. The 24-storey Seda Vertis North hotel, among the largest in northern Metro Manila with 438 rooms, is also situated in Vertis North. Above the Vertis North mall is the multi-tower Vertis North Corporate Center, where several BPO companies operate.

Residential developments in Vertis North include Avida Vita, Avida Sola, Alveo's High Park, and Alveo's Orean Place.

Planned
Among the planned buildings to be built within Vertis North include the 43-storey office building One Vertis Plaza and the 33-storey integrated hotel and resort-casino Solaire North.

See also
Araneta Center

References

Buildings and structures in Quezon City
Mixed-use developments in Metro Manila
Planned communities in the Philippines
Tourist attractions in Quezon City
Shopping districts and streets in Metro Manila